To the Bone may refer to:

Film and TV
 "To the Bone" (Law & Order: Criminal Intent), an episode of Law & Order: Criminal Intent
 To the Bone (film), a 2017 American film

Music
 ToTheBones, an English rock band
 To the Bone (Kris Kristofferson album) (1981)
 To the Bone (The Kinks album) (1994)
 To the Bone (Steven Wilson album) (2017), or the title track
 To the Bone (song), a song by Quavo and Takeoff with YoungBoy Never Broke Again